Beargrass Creek is a stream in the U.S. state of Indiana. It is a tributary of the Eel River.

Beargrass Creek was so named on account of wild grass which was a food source of bears.

See also
List of rivers of Indiana

References

Rivers of Miami County, Indiana
Rivers of Wabash County, Indiana
Rivers of Indiana